Melton Hill Dam is a hydroelectric dam on the Clinch River just south of Oak Ridge, Tennessee, United States.   The dam is operated by the Tennessee Valley Authority, which built the dam in the early 1960s to extend the Tennessee Valley's continuous navigation channel up the Clinch as far as Clinton and to increase TVA's overall power-generating capacity.  The dam impounds the  Melton Hill Lake, and is the only TVA tributary dam serviced by a navigation lock.  The dam and associated infrastructure were listed on the National Register of Historic Places in 2017.

Melton Hill Dam was named for a knob atop nearby Copper Ridge where the U.S. Coast and Geodetic Survey installed a triangulation station in 1884.

Location
Melton Hill's tailwaters are part of Watts Bar Lake, a main Tennessee River channel impoundment that extends across the lower  of the Clinch.

Capacity
Melton Hill is a concrete gravity-type dam with an electric power generation capacity of 79 megawatts.  The dam is 103 feet (31 m) high and stretches 1,020 feet (311 m) across the Clinch River.  The dam is equipped with a 3-bay spillway that has a total discharge of 118,000 cubic feet (3,341 cubic meters) per second.

Melton Hill Lake provides nearly 193 miles (311 km) of shoreline and 5,470 acres (22 km²) of water surface for navigation and recreation, and includes parts of Loudon, Roane, Anderson, and Knox counties.

Melton Hill is the only TVA dam on a tributary stream (i.e., not on the Tennessee River) with a navigation lock.  The lock is  x , and lowers and raises vessels  between Melton Hill Lake and Watts Bar Lake and vice versa.

Background and construction

The U.S. Army Corps of Engineers recognized the dam potential of the Melton Hill site as early as the 1920s, and the Tennessee Valley Authority began investigating the site as part of its lower Clinch Valley surveys in the late 1930s.  TVA first proposed the Melton Hill project in 1957, and after several years of lobbying, Congress agreed to fund the dam's construction.  President Dwight D. Eisenhower signed the funding bill into law on September 2, 1960, and TVA began building the dam on September 6, 1960.

The commission agreed to give this land to TVA in exchange for lands further downstream along Watts Bar Lake. The project's most problematic relocation issue involved an experimental farm operated by the Agricultural Research Laboratory, a joint initiative of the AEC and the University of Tennessee. To replace the farm, TVA purchased and paid for the re-seeding of an  plot nearby above reservoir operating levels.

Melton Hill Dam was completed and its gates closed on May 1, 1963.  Its first generator went online July 3, 1964, and its second generator went online November 11, 1964.  The dam's lock was designed by the Army Corps of Engineers, which based the design on the Corps' Old Hickory Dam lock in Middle Tennessee.  The Melton Hill lock is bigger than the typical 60x360-foot locks used by TVA's Tennessee River dams, allowing Melton Hill to accommodate several barges simultaneously.  The lock was placed in service June 10, 1963.

See also

National Register of Historic Places listings in Loudon County, Tennessee

References

External links

Melton Hill Reservoir — official TVA site
Melton Hill Reservoir — Tennessee Wildlife Resources Agency 
Pellissippi Blueway

Dams in Tennessee
Tennessee Valley Authority dams
Hydroelectric power plants in Tennessee
Buildings and structures in Roane County, Tennessee
Buildings and structures in Loudon County, Tennessee
Oak Ridge, Tennessee
Dams completed in 1963
Energy infrastructure completed in 1963
Historic districts in Tennessee
National Register of Historic Places in Loudon County, Tennessee
Dams on the National Register of Historic Places in Tennessee